The Noginsk constituency (No.110) was a Russian legislative constituency in Moscow Oblast. It was based in eastern suburbs and exurbs of Moscow. Most of Noginsk constituency was placed into Shchyolkovo constituency after 2015 redistricting.

Members elected

Election results

1993

|-
! colspan=2 style="background-color:#E9E9E9;text-align:left;vertical-align:top;" |Candidate
! style="background-color:#E9E9E9;text-align:left;vertical-align:top;" |Party
! style="background-color:#E9E9E9;text-align:right;" |Votes
! style="background-color:#E9E9E9;text-align:right;" |%
|-
|style="background-color:"|
|align=left|Nikolay Stolyarov
|align=left|Independent
|
|11.20%
|-
|style="background-color:"|
|align=left|Anatoly Lobanov
|align=left|Independent
| -
|11.10%
|-
| colspan="5" style="background-color:#E9E9E9;"|
|- style="font-weight:bold"
| colspan="3" style="text-align:left;" | Total
| 
| 100%
|-
| colspan="5" style="background-color:#E9E9E9;"|
|- style="font-weight:bold"
| colspan="4" |Source:
|
|}

1995

|-
! colspan=2 style="background-color:#E9E9E9;text-align:left;vertical-align:top;" |Candidate
! style="background-color:#E9E9E9;text-align:left;vertical-align:top;" |Party
! style="background-color:#E9E9E9;text-align:right;" |Votes
! style="background-color:#E9E9E9;text-align:right;" |%
|-
|style="background-color:"|
|align=left|Nikolay Stolyarov (incumbent)
|align=left|Independent
|
|19.93%
|-
|style="background-color:"|
|align=left|Nikolay Pashin
|align=left|Our Home – Russia
|
|14.93%
|-
|style="background-color:"|
|align=left|Vitaly Aristov
|align=left|Communist Party
|
|14.91%
|-
|style="background-color:"|
|align=left|Tatyana Yarygina
|align=left|Yabloko
|
|12.52%
|-
|style="background-color:"|
|align=left|Aleksey Lezhnev
|align=left|Independent
|
|9.22%
|-
|style="background-color:"|
|align=left|Sergey Sychev
|align=left|Independent
|
|4.11%
|-
|style="background-color:"|
|align=left|Vitaly Orlov
|align=left|Independent
|
|2.86%
|-
|style="background-color:"|
|align=left|Anatoly Osipov
|align=left|Independent
|
|2.63%
|-
|style="background-color:#959698"|
|align=left|Zoya Yegorova
|align=left|Derzhava
|
|1.45%
|-
|style="background-color:"|
|align=left|Oleg Finko
|align=left|Liberal Democratic Party
|
|1.35%
|-
|style="background-color:#3C3E42"|
|align=left|Viktor Gavrilov
|align=left|Duma-96
|
|1.02%
|-
|style="background-color:#F5A222"|
|align=left|Oleg Filippov
|align=left|Interethnic Union
|
|0.58%
|-
|style="background-color:#000000"|
|colspan=2 |against all
|
|11.57%
|-
| colspan="5" style="background-color:#E9E9E9;"|
|- style="font-weight:bold"
| colspan="3" style="text-align:left;" | Total
| 
| 100%
|-
| colspan="5" style="background-color:#E9E9E9;"|
|- style="font-weight:bold"
| colspan="4" |Source:
|
|}

1999

|-
! colspan=2 style="background-color:#E9E9E9;text-align:left;vertical-align:top;" |Candidate
! style="background-color:#E9E9E9;text-align:left;vertical-align:top;" |Party
! style="background-color:#E9E9E9;text-align:right;" |Votes
! style="background-color:#E9E9E9;text-align:right;" |%
|-
|style="background-color:"|
|align=left|Vladimir Pekarev
|align=left|Independent
|
|20.58%
|-
|style="background-color:#3B9EDF"|
|align=left|Nikolay Stolyarov (incumbent)
|align=left|Fatherland – All Russia
|
|18.05%
|-
|style="background-color:"|
|align=left|Yury Ivanov
|align=left|Communist Party
|
|16.14%
|-
|style="background-color:"|
|align=left|Vera Krylyshkina
|align=left|Yabloko
|
|9.14%
|-
|style="background-color:"|
|align=left|Valery Litvinov
|align=left|Independent
|
|5.20%
|-
|style="background-color:"|
|align=left|Nikolay Ozerov
|align=left|Independent
|
|2.81%
|-
|style="background:#1042A5"| 
|align=left|Vladimir Alferov
|align=left|Union of Right Forces
|
|2.45%
|-
|style="background-color:"|
|align=left|Aleksandr Romanovich
|align=left|Independent
|
|2.43%
|-
|style="background-color:"|
|align=left|Lyubov Panchenko
|align=left|Our Home – Russia
|
|2.28%
|-
|style="background-color:"|
|align=left|Yevgeny Khoroshevtsev
|align=left|Unity
|
|2.08%
|-
|style="background-color:#084284"|
|align=left|Vitaly Aristov
|align=left|Spiritual Heritage
|
|1.50%
|-
|style="background-color:"|
|align=left|Anatoly Koltunov
|align=left|Independent
|
|1.10%
|-
|style="background-color:"|
|align=left|Vladimir Davydov
|align=left|Independent
|
|0.85%
|-
|style="background-color:#000000"|
|colspan=2 |against all
|
|13.13%
|-
| colspan="5" style="background-color:#E9E9E9;"|
|- style="font-weight:bold"
| colspan="3" style="text-align:left;" | Total
| 
| 100%
|-
| colspan="5" style="background-color:#E9E9E9;"|
|- style="font-weight:bold"
| colspan="4" |Source:
|
|}

2003

|-
! colspan=2 style="background-color:#E9E9E9;text-align:left;vertical-align:top;" |Candidate
! style="background-color:#E9E9E9;text-align:left;vertical-align:top;" |Party
! style="background-color:#E9E9E9;text-align:right;" |Votes
! style="background-color:#E9E9E9;text-align:right;" |%
|-
|style="background-color:"|
|align=left|Vladimir Pekarev (incumbent)
|align=left|Independent
|
|50.49%
|-
|style="background-color:"|
|align=left|Aleksey Vedekhov
|align=left|Independent
|
|10.07%
|-
|style="background:#1042A5"| 
|align=left|Anatoly Sonin
|align=left|Union of Right Forces
|
|4.87%
|-
|style="background-color:#00A1FF"|
|align=left|Sergey Burov
|align=left|Party of Russia's Rebirth-Russian Party of Life
|
|3.89%
|-
|style="background-color:"|
|align=left|Sergey Golubev
|align=left|Independent
|
|3.03%
|-
|style="background-color:#164C8C"|
|align=left|Sergey Kulakov
|align=left|United Russian Party Rus'
|
|2.72%
|-
|style="background-color:#000000"|
|colspan=2 |against all
|
|22.50%
|-
| colspan="5" style="background-color:#E9E9E9;"|
|- style="font-weight:bold"
| colspan="3" style="text-align:left;" | Total
| 
| 100%
|-
| colspan="5" style="background-color:#E9E9E9;"|
|- style="font-weight:bold"
| colspan="4" |Source:
|
|}

Notes

References

Obsolete Russian legislative constituencies
Politics of Moscow Oblast